I Tartassati is an Italian comedy film from 1959, directed by Stefano Vanzina, written by Aldo Fabrizi, starring Totò and Louis de Funès. The film is known under the titles The Overtaxed (English) and Fripouillard et Compagnie (French).

Plot
Mr. Pezzella (Totò) owns and runs a successful luxury clothes shop. He does not like to pay taxes, and he resorts to the services of a tax consultant (interpreted by Louis de Funès) in order minimize this expense and exploit every loophole. Unfortunately for Pezzella, the Borders and Revenue police (Guardia di Finanza) suspects his high income, and orders an inspection by marshal Topponi (Aldo Fabrizi) and brigadier Bardi. Pezzella is advised by his incompetent tax consultant to try bribing the marshal in every possible way. Pezzella's clumsy attempts and intrusiveness create many misunderstandings and comedic situations. The honest marshal remains unaffected and completes his report, which would force Pezzella to pay a heavy 15 million lire fine.
As a last resort, Pezzella manages to steal the marshal's bag, with all the official documents on which the inspection is based. But in the end, perhaps moved by pity for Topponi who would get in trouble with his superiors if unable to produce the documents, and has become over time a familiar figure and is revealed to also be father of Pezzella's son love interest, the rich shop owner decides to follow instead his conscience and to return the bag, facing any charges.

Cast 
 Totò: Torquato Pezzella, director of magazine "Tessuti"
 Aldo Fabrizi: Fabio Topponi, the polyvalent fiscal inspector
 Louis de Funès: Hector "Ettore" Curto, conseiller fiscal
 Anna Campori: Dora Pezzella
 Miranda Campa: L'épouse de Fabio
 Luciano Marin: Augustin "Tino" Pezzella
 Ciccio Barbi: the brigadier
 Anna Maria Bottini: Mara
 Cathia Caro: Laura, the girl of Topponi
 Jacques Dufilho: the director of the prison
 Elena Fabrizi: Une infirmière
 Ignazio Leone: the guard - village
 Fernand Sardou: Ernesto Topponi, l'oncle de Laura
 Jean Bellanger: the security guard of the prison
 Miranda Campa: L'épouse de fabio
 Nando Bruno: L'Ubracio
 Piera Arico
 Gianni Cobelli
 Mario Corbelli
 Cesare Fantoni
 Lamberto Antinori

References

External links 
 
 

1959 films
Italian comedy films
1950s Italian-language films
Italian black-and-white films
Films directed by Stefano Vanzina
Films set in Rome
Films with screenplays by Ruggero Maccari
1959 comedy films
1950s Italian films